Lieutenant General Sanjeev Kumar Shrivastava, PVSM, AVSM is a former General Officer in the Indian Army. He last served as the Engineer-in-Chief of the Indian Army. He assumed office on 1 April 2018, taking over from Lt Gen Suresh Sharma.

Career
Shrivastava is an alumnus of National Defence Academy, Pune and the Indian Military Academy, Dehradun. He was commissioned into the Bengal Sappers of the Corps of Engineers in 1980.

During his career, He has attended the Defence Services Staff College, Army War College, Mhow and the National Defence College, New Delhi.

Shrivastava is a Post Graduate in Docks and Harbour from Indian Institute of Technology Bombay and has M Phil degrees from Devi Ahilya Vishwavidyalaya, Indore and Madras University.

Shrivastava commanded an Engineer regiment during Operation Parakram and an Engineer Brigade. He later served as the Director General Combat Engineers. In February 2017, he took over as the Director General Border Roads Organisation (DGBR) from Lt Gen Suresh Sharma who went on to become Engineer-in-Chief.

As the Engineer-in-Chief, he served as the Senior Colonel Commandant of the Corps of Engineers.

Shrivastava was awarded the Ati Vishisht Seva Medal in 2018 for his outstanding services and achievements in fast-tracking the execution of Indo-China Border Roads. He was awarded the Param Vishisht Seva Medal in 2020 during his tenure as Engineer-in-Chief.

References 

Living people
Indian generals
Recipients of the Ati Vishisht Seva Medal
National Defence Academy (India) alumni
Indian Military Academy alumni
Year of birth missing (living people)
National Defence College, India alumni
Army War College, Mhow alumni
Defence Services Staff College alumni